Russian submarine K-336 Pskov ) is a  attack submarine of the Russian Navy. She is named after the Russian city Pskov.

History
This ship, originally named Okun (Perch), was laid down as the last Sierra II-class submarine in 1990 at the  Krasnoye Soromovo factory in Nizhny Novgorod. After the hull was launched in 1992, it was towed to the Sevmash shipyard in Severodvinsk for completion and sea trials.

The boat was commissioned in 1993, serving in the Russian Northern Fleet, based in Ara Bay, Vidyaevo. It was commanded by Captain 1st Rank Andrei Sapelkin, alongside Captain Lieutenant Viktor Petrashov, two of the most decorated leaders in the Russian Fleet.

On March 5, 2003, Pskov was being overhauled in a dry dock in Roslyakovo. The wooden scaffolding surrounding the hull was ignited by the welding work that was done to the ship, and a fire broke out. After 90 minutes, the fire was put out, and Pskovs outer soundproofing rubber coating was damaged. There were no casualties or radiation leakage. The submarine was believed to be operational again from early 2007.

In 2012 the submarine was overhauled again, and returned to active duty in 2016. The refit included a new sonar and replacement of uranium fuel in the submarine's reactor.

References

External links
Nuclear submarine on fire, Bellona
Type 945 "Sierra" class, Aeronautics.ru
RFS Pskov Webpage 

Sierra-class submarines
Ships built in the Soviet Union
Ships built by Krasnoye Sormovo Factory No. 112
1992 ships
Ships of the Russian Northern Fleet
Submarines of Russia